Wellington Jeffers Morden (September 28, 1837 – December 26, 1928) was mayor of Hamilton, Ontario, Canada, from 1902 to 1903.

External links
 Hamilton Public Library biography
 

1837 births
1928 deaths
Mayors of Hamilton, Ontario